Breizh eo ma bro! (meaning "Brittany is my country!" in Breton) is a musical compilation. The group of artists taking part pay tribute in Brittany by taking back songs in touch with this region.

Commercial performance
The album debuted at number 26 in France with 3,800 sales. The next week, it rose at number 15  selling 4,820 sales. The following week, it fell to number 18 with sale of 3,461 album copies. By the end of the year 2017, the album had sold around 25,000 units.

Track list

Credits 
 Patrice Marzin, Soïg Sibéril, Jacques Pellen, Michel-Yves Kochmann, Philippe Russo, Sébastien Chouard - guitars
 Ronan Le Bars, Kevin Camus - uilleann pipes, whistles
 Robert Le Gall - violin, mandoline
 Pierre Stéphan - violin
 Yannig Noguet - Diatonic button accordion
 Nikolaz Cadoret, Cécile Corbel - Celtic harp
 Jean-Claude Auclin - Cello
 Franck Eulry - Keyboards, arrangements, orchestrations
 Sofia Symphonic Orchestra 
 Recording and mixing - Stéphane Briand
 Mastering - Hubert Salou

Charts

References 
 

2017 compilation albums